Dnyanvani - 90.4 FM, is the 1st community radio of the satellite city Navi Mumbai.  It is a community service initiative by the Padmashree Dr. D.Y. Patil University.  It broadcasts local programmes prepared by the students and the residents of Navi Mumbai, covering areas of Education, Health and Well Being, Sports, Spirituality, and overall Community Development.

It is fondly called DY Radio by the students and locale of the community. It has a broadcast range of about 12–15 km(aerially) extending from Airoli to Panvel (the two extreme end of Navi Mumbai).

References

Navi Mumbai